Lawrence Township is the name of some places in the U.S. state of Pennsylvania:

Lawrence Township, Clearfield County, Pennsylvania
Lawrence Township, Tioga County, Pennsylvania

Pennsylvania township disambiguation pages